John Barry Curtis is a retired Anglican bishop in Canada.

Born on 19 June 1933, he was educated at Trinity College, Toronto and ordained after a period of study at Chichester Theological College in 1959. He began his ordained ministry as a curate in Pembroke, Ontario. After this he held incumbencies  in Kanata, Ontario, Buckingham, Quebec, Westboro, Ottawa and Elbow Park, Calgary. He became  Bishop of Calgary and  Metropolitan of Rupert's Land in 1994, retiring from both posts in 1999.

References

1933 births
Alumni of Chichester Theological College
Trinity College (Canada) alumni
Anglican bishops of Calgary
20th-century Anglican Church of Canada bishops
20th-century Anglican archbishops
Metropolitans of Rupert's Land
Living people